To confess is to admit one's guilt or to admit one's belief.

Confess may also refer to:
 Confess (TV series)
 Confess (film), a 2005 thriller film
 "Confess" (song), a 1948 vocal duet
 Confess (album), an album by Twin Shadow
 Confess (band), an Iranian band
 Confess is the autobiography of Judas Priest frontman Rob Halford

See also
 Confession (disambiguation)